Vocaloid 5 is a singing voice synthesizer and successor to Vocaloid 4 in the Vocaloid series. It was succeeded by Vocaloid 6.

History 
On July 2, 2018, Yamaha announced that both the official Vocaloid website and shop would be temporarily shut down for maintenance on July 12, 2018, with several Vocaloid products scheduled for discontinuation. On the day of the maintenance, information on upcoming non-Yamaha vocal Haruno Sora was leaked through a preorder listing; the package was listed as an add-on for the then-unannounced Vocaloid 5. Several hours later, once the maintenance had been completed, Yamaha relaunched the Vocaloid website, officially revealing and releasing Vocaloid 5 at the same time.

Vocaloid 5 features a redesigned interface that has been described as "significantly more modern" than that of previous versions. It is the first release of Vocaloid to be exclusively sold as a bundle; all purchases include four default voicebanks - Amy, Chris, Kaori, and Ken. These voicebanks share a wide variety of preset audio samples, vocal samples, and singing styles, in both English and Japanese. Vocaloid 5 also offers finer control over many vocal functions; it includes several audio effects, editors, and parameters to manipulate output in ways that traditionally required the use of additional programs. 

Vocaloid 5 requires a 64-bit operating system. Vocaloid 2 voicebanks are no longer officially supported, though voicebanks from Vocaloid 3 and newer are able to be used. Cross-synthesis (XSY) and job plug-ins do not function in Vocaloid 5.

The Vocaloid Editor for Cubase was updated to version 4.5 with the release of Vocaloid 5.

Products

Amy 
Amy is an English voicebank released as an integrated part of Vocaloid 5 on July 12, 2018. Her voice has been described as "expressive" and "versatile".

Chris 
Chris is an English voicebank released as an integrated part of Vocaloid 5 on July 12, 2018. His voice has been described as able to sing from "delicate, soft bass" to "powerful, sustained high tones".

Cyber Diva II 
This voicebank is a minor update to the Cyber Diva package. It was released on July 12, 2018.

Cyber Songman II 
This voicebank is a minor update to the Cyber Songman package. It was released on 2018.

Kaori 
Kaori is a Japanese voicebank released as an integrated part of Vocaloid 5 on July 12, 2018. Her voice has been described as "soulful".

Ken 
Ken is a Japanese voicebank released as an integrated part of Vocaloid 5 on July 12, 2018. His voice has been described as "sharp" and "clear" with a "light vocal quality".

VY1 
This voicebank is a minor update to the VY1v4 package. It was released on July 12, 2018. VY1 only includes VY1v4's "Normal" vocal.

VY2 
This voicebank is a minor update to the VY2v3 package; it primarily adds the "growl" function. It was released on July 12, 2018. VY2 only includes VY2v3's "Standard" vocal.

Haruno Sora 
Haruno Sora is a voicebank for Vocaloid 5 and Voiceroid 2 developed by AH-Software and released on July 26, 2018. Her voice provider is Kikuko Inoue. The voicebank has two voice libraries, "Natural" and "Cool".

Meika Hime & Mikoto 
Meika Hime & Mikoto are two Vocaloid 5 voicebanks created by Gynoid Co., Ltd and sampled from the voice actress Kotori Koiwai. They were released for Vocaloid on March 30, 2019, along with text-to-speech software.

References

External links 

  

Speech synthesis software
Vocaloid